Ernest Vincent (28 October 1910 – 2 June 1978) was an English footballer. His regular position was at half back. He was born in Seaham, County Durham. He played for Dawdon Colliery, Ryhope Colliery, Seaham Harbour, Washington Colliery, Southport, Manchester United, Queens Park Rangers and Doncaster Rovers.

External links
MUFCInfo.com profile

1910 births
1978 deaths
English footballers
Southport F.C. players
Manchester United F.C. players
Queens Park Rangers F.C. players
Doncaster Rovers F.C. players
Sportspeople from Seaham
Footballers from County Durham
Washington Colliery F.C. players
Association football defenders